Shri Hanuman Mandir Dharamshala School, officially known as SHMD School, is an English medium, co-educational private higher secondary school in Jaigaon, a town in West Bengal sharing its border with the Himalayan Kingdom of Bhutan. SHMD School is established, owned and managed by the SHMD Trust of Jaigaon. It is affiliated to the Central Board of Secondary Education in Delhi.

The principal is Mr Prakash Kumar Samal, and was changed in August 2018 by former principal Mr. Peter George Thomas. The school's motto is "Lighted to Shine".This simple message is pregnant with meaning. The SHMD-ians are trained (Lighted) to move ahead and illuminate (Shine) the dark corners of our great nation.

SHMD School is a strong institution staffed by highly qualified teachers. The school has a modern campus designed to provide a learning and the living environment that would meet the academic, development and social needs of students. The school is equipped with science laboratories, computer laboratory, auditorium, library and play ground. SHMD was created to meet the local necessity for primary education and has since upgraded to offer higher secondary education. The students have won accolades in several national level competitions, from Olympiads to national level quiz contests.

Houses :
  Ashoka House (green house)
 Gandhi House (blue house)
 Subhash House (red house)
 Tagore House (yellow house)
When it was established in 1992, students used to sit on the floor. It gradually upgraded with the time because of the chairman of the school, Sri Lal Chand Prasad.

References

External links 
 https://shmdschool.edu.in/

Private schools in West Bengal
Primary schools in West Bengal
High schools and secondary schools in West Bengal
Schools in Jalpaiguri district
1992 establishments in West Bengal
Educational institutions established in 1992